The Armenian Evangelical Church is an Armenian Evangelical temple in the neighbourhood of Brazo Oriental, Montevideo. It constitutes the headquarters of this Church for Uruguay, the institution being a member of the Federation of the Evangelical Churches of Uruguay (established in 1956), which is affiliated with the Commission on World Mission and Evangelism of the World Council of Churches.

References

External links

Brazo Oriental
Armenian Evangelical churches
Armenian churches in Uruguay
Protestantism in Uruguay
Church buildings in Montevideo